Former Dodgers pitcher Burleigh Grimes was brought in to manage the 1937 Brooklyn Dodgers, but the team continued to struggle, finishing in sixth place.

Offseason 
 November 19, 1936: Tony Malinosky was purchased by the Dodgers from the Pittsburgh Pirates.
 December 4, 1936: Ed Brandt was traded by the Dodgers to the Pittsburgh Pirates for Cookie Lavagetto and Ralph Birkofer.
 December 5, 1936: Lonny Frey was traded by the Dodgers to the Chicago Cubs for Roy Henshaw and Woody English.

Regular season

Season standings

Record vs. opponents

Notable transactions 
 May 2, 1937: Roy Spencer was purchased by the Dodgers from the New York Giants.
 May 24, 1937: Randy Moore was traded by the Dodgers to the St. Louis Cardinals for Paul Chervinko.
 June 11, 1937: Tom Baker was traded by the Dodgers to the New York Giants for Freddie Fitzsimmons.
 June 12, 1937: Waite Hoyt was purchased by the Dodgers from the Pittsburgh Pirates.
 July 11, 1937: Ralph Birkofer was traded by the Dodgers to the Detroit Tigers for Lindsay Brown and cash.
 July 23, 1937: Frank Skaff and cash were traded by the Dodgers to the Washington Senators for Jake Daniel.
 August 9, 1937: Ben Cantwell was purchased by the Dodgers from the New York Giants.
 September 10, 1937: Tot Pressnell was purchased by the Dodgers from the Cleveland Indians.
 September 10, 1937: Ben Geraghty and Jack Radtke were traded by the Dodgers to the Washington Senators for Fred Chapman.
 October 4, 1937: Johnny Cooney, Jim Bucher, Joe Stripp and Roy Henshaw were traded by the Dodgers to the St. Louis Cardinals for Leo Durocher.

Roster

Player stats

Batting

Starters by position 
Note: Pos = Position; G = Games played; AB = At bats; H = Hits; Avg. = Batting average; HR = Home runs; RBI = Runs batted in

Other batters 
Note: G = Games played; AB = At bats; H = Hits; Avg. = Batting average; HR = Home runs; RBI = Runs batted in

Pitching

Starting pitchers 
Note: G = Games pitched; IP = Innings pitched; W = Wins; L = Losses; ERA = Earned run average; SO = Strikeouts

Other pitchers 
Note: G = Games pitched; IP = Innings pitched; W = Wins; L = Losses; ERA = Earned run average; SO = Strikeouts

Relief pitchers 
Note: G = Games pitched; W = Wins; L = Losses; SV = Saves; ERA = Earned run average; SO = Strikeouts

Awards and honors 
1937 Major League Baseball All-Star Game
Van Mungo reserve

Farm System 

LEAGUE CHAMPIONS: Elmira

Notes

References 
Baseball-Reference season page
Baseball Almanac season page

External links 
1937 Brooklyn Dodgers uniform
Brooklyn Dodgers reference site
Acme Dodgers page 
Retrosheet

Los Angeles Dodgers seasons
Brooklyn Dodgers
Brooklyn
1930s in Brooklyn
Flatbush, Brooklyn